Nicocortonide is a synthetic glucocorticoid corticosteroid which was never marketed.

See also
 Proligestone

References

Secondary alcohols
Corticosteroid cyclic ketals
Corticosteroid esters
Corticosteroids
Cyclic acetals with aldehydes
Glucocorticoids
Isonicotinate esters
Pregnanes
Abandoned drugs